George Hawi (born 5 November 1938 – 21 June 2005) was a Lebanese politician and former secretary general of the Lebanese Communist Party (LCP). An outspoken critic of Syrian interference in Lebanese affairs, he was killed in 2005 by a bomb placed under the passenger seat of his car. Lebanese people accused the Syrian government of assassinating him. He was the stepfather of the Lebanese Armenian politician Rafi Madayan, who also has a stepson, Charbel Khalifeh Hachem.

Early life and career
George Hawi was born in the village of Bteghrine, Lebanon on 5 November 1938 to a Lebanese family. Although born into an Antiochian Greek Orthodox Christian family, Hawi was a professed atheist. 

He became active in student politics in his early years at university, participating in numerous strikes and demonstrations and in several popular movements. He joined the LCP in 1955 and became one of the main leaders of its Student League by the end of the decade. In 1955 he became a member of the LCP which had been illegal in Lebanon. 

In 1964, he was imprisoned for his involvement in a strike against Lebanon's state-controlled tobacco manufacturer. In 1969 he was again in prison for participation in a demonstration on 23 April in support of the Palestinian cause, and again in 1970 for his part in attacking an army detachment.

Hawi was briefly expelled from the LCP in 1967 for calling for more independence from the policies of the Soviet Union. He rejoined the Party and was elected a member of its political bureau in the second and third congresses in 1968 and 1972.  Hawi was elected as the general secretary of the Lebanese Communist Party after its fourth congress in 1979 – a position he kept until 1993 when he resigned. He was the fourth general secretary of the party following Fuad Shemali, Farajallah el-Helou and Nicolas Shawi. He was succeeded by Farouk Dahrouj.

During the Lebanese Civil War Hawi, who used the kunya-style nom de guerre "Abu Anis", established the Popular Guard, the LCP militia, which was aligned with the Lebanese National Movement (LNM) of Druze leader Kamal Jumblatt in its opposition to the Maronite-dominated government and Christian-backed militias.

The LCP was also active in the guerrilla warfare against Israel and its proxy militia, the South Lebanon Army (SLA), in southern Lebanon, after the Israeli invasion in 1982. During the invasion he created the Lebanese National Resistance Front together with Muhsin Ibrahim. LNRF was commanded by Elias Atallah. At later stages of the war, the LCP under Hawi allied with Syria, which had entered Lebanon in 1976, but was to stay in the country for nearly 30 years.

He became a critic of the influence of Damascus on Lebanon late in his life, after having left the LCP in 2000. In 2004, he supported the foundation of the leftist Democratic Left Movement (DLM), that was against the Syrian presence in Lebanon and participated in the Independence Uprising of 2005. Murdered journalist Samir Kassir was a prominent member and co-founder of this group.

In June 2005, Hawi claimed in an interview with Al Jazeera, that Rifaat al-Assad, brother of Hafez al Assad and uncle of Syria's current President Bashar al-Assad, had been behind the killing of Jumblatt.

Assassination
George Hawi was assassinated on 21 June 2005 when a bomb planted in his Mercedes car was detonated by remote control, as he travelled through Beirut's Wata Musaitbi neighbourhood. A nearly one-pound charge was placed under his seat, and was detonated by remote control. His driver survived, but Hawi was mortally wounded in the blast. Several sources including the March 14 Alliance and members of the Western media immediately blamed Syria for his killing and for the other explosions in the capital though a definitive culprit has yet to be found.

In August 2011, the Special Tribunal for Lebanon informed members of Hawi's family that they had found a link between his murder and that of former Lebanese Prime Minister Rafic Hariri. The STL had previously issued indictments against members of Hezbollah for the Hariri killing.

See also
 Lebanese Communist Party
 Democratic Left Movement
 Hanna Gharib
 Kamal Jumblatt
 Lebanese National Resistance Front
 List of assassinated Lebanese politicians

References

1938 births
2005 deaths
Former Lebanese Orthodox Christians
Lebanese atheists
Lebanese left-wing activists
Lebanese socialists
Lebanese democracy activists
Assassinated Lebanese politicians
Deaths by car bomb in Lebanon
Lebanese terrorism victims
People from Matn District
People murdered in Lebanon
Terrorism deaths in Lebanon
Lebanese former Eastern Orthodox Christians
Former Greek Orthodox Christians
Lebanese Communist Party politicians
People of the Lebanese Civil War
Lebanese secularists